Community Park, now known as George Taylor Field, is a stadium in St. Catharines, Ontario, Canada.  It is primarily used for baseball and is the home park for the Niagara Metros of the Central Ontario Baseball League (a senior AAA men's baseball league) and Brock Badgers Baseball (Brock University).

It was formerly home to the St. Catharines Blue Jays and St. Catharines Stompers of the Short-Season 'A' affiliate of the Toronto Blue Jays in the New York–Penn League. The ballpark currently has a seating capacity of 2,000 (originally 2,500).

History

The current field and grandstand was opened in 1986 during the first seasons for the Blue Jays. The stadium was built or reconfigured from the former Merritton Community Park baseball field from 1960s.

The park was originally named the Merritton Baseball Field and is now referred to as George Taylor Field renamed in honour of Merritton native and former St. Catharines Blue Jays/St. Catharines Stompers groundskeeper George "Clickey" Taylor.

References

External links 
 Community Park
 Photo gallery of stadium

Baseball venues in Ontario
Brock University athletics
Minor league baseball venues
Sports venues in St. Catharines